Piper excelsum (formerly known as Macropiper excelsum), of the Pepper Family (Piperaceae) commonly known as kawakawa, is a small tree to 20 feet (six meters) of which the subspecies P. excelsum subsp. excelsum is endemic to New Zealand; the subspecies P. e. subsp. psittacorum is found on Lord Howe Island, Norfolk Island and the Kermadec Islands.

Description

Kawakawa is found throughout the North Island, and as far south as Okarito (43.20 °S) on the West Coast, and Banks Peninsula (43.5 °S) on the east coast of the South Island. The leaves are often covered with holes caused by the caterpillar of the kawakawa looper moth (Cleora scriptaria). The images depict the variety majus which has larger and more glossy leaves than P. excelsum.  The name kawakawa comes from the Māori language, where it refers to the bitter taste of the leaves, from kawa or bitter.

Leaves
Kawakawa leaves are about 5–10 cm long by 6–12 cm wide; they are opposite to each other, broadly rounded with a short drawn-out tip and are heart-shaped at their bases. The leaves are deep green in colour if growing in the forest, but may be yellowish-green in more open situations.

Flowers
The flowers are produced on greenish, erect spikes 2.5–7.5 cm long. Kawakawa flowers are quite minute and very closely placed around the spike. After pollination the flowers gradually swell and become fleshy to form small, berry-like fruits that are yellow to bright orange.

Berries
Each berry cluster is the size of a small finger. Ripening period is January and February. These fruits are favoured by kererū or New Zealand pigeon (Hemiphaga novaeseelandiae) and tui (Prosthemadera novaeseelandiae).

Uses
Kawakawa is a traditional medicinal plant of the Māori. An infusion is made from the leaves or roots, and used for bladder problems, boils, bruises, to relieve pain or toothache, or as a general tonic. The sweet edible yellow berries (most often found in summer on female trees) of the plant were eaten as a diuretic.

It also is important in cultural contexts: host people of a marae wave leaves of kawakawa to welcome guests. At a tangi, both hosts and guests may wear wreaths of kawakawa on the head as a sign of mourning.

It is commonly grown as an ornamental plant in gardens.

Relationship with kava
Kawakawa is sometimes called "Māori kava" and is often confused with the kava plant (Piper methysticum). While the two plants look similar and have similar names, they are different, albeit related, species.

Kava is a traditional plant and beverage of the South Pacific. The roots of the plant are used to produce a drink with medicinal, sedative, anesthetic, euphoriant, and entheogenic properties. It is most likely not a coincidence that this plant has a similar name to kawakawa. One source stated: "In New Zealand, where the climate is too cold for kava, the Māori gave the name kawa-kawa to another Piperaceae, P. excelsum, in memory of the kava plants they undoubtedly brought with them and unsuccessfully attempted to cultivate. The Māori word kawa also means "ceremonial protocol", recalling the stylised consumption of the drug typical of Polynesian societies."

Gallery

See also
Domesticated plants and animals of Austronesia

Notes

References

External links

 Kawakawa, In: The Encyclopedia of Alternative & Natural Medicine

Flora of Norfolk Island
Magnoliids of Australia
excelsum
Trees of New Zealand
Trees of Australia
Spices
Ornamental trees
Plants used in traditional Māori medicine
Flora of Lord Howe Island
Māori cuisine
Plants described in 1786
Taxa named by Georg Forster